Abraham Lincoln Tower & Justin S. Morrill Tower, also known as The Towers, Morrill Tower or Lincoln Tower are two undergraduate residential houses at The Ohio State University. The Towers are located on the west campus of the Ohio State University across from the Drake Union off the east banks of the Olentangy River. Morrill Tower is to the right of Ohio Stadium on Cannon Drive. The towers are in close proximity of OSU's RPAC (Recreation and Physical Activity Center) and the Wexner Medical Center.

History
Plans for the Towers, by the architectural firm Schooley, Cornelius and Schooley, were approved by the OSU Housing Commission on December 10, 1964. The Towers were dedicated on November 11, 1965 with the groundbreaking ceremony having been held on March 29, 1965. The buildings were not completed until August 1967, but the first ten stories were completed and opened to students for the Autumn Quarter of 1966.

Morrill Tower
Justin S. Morrill Tower was named for Justin S. Morrill. Morrill was a U.S. Representative (and later Senator) from Vermont. Morrill introduced legislation, which would have had states sell public land in order to provide an endowment for a state university, which failed. Morrill reintroduced the bill to Congress in 1861, and this time it passed and was signed into law by President Abraham Lincoln on July 2, 1862. The Land Grant—or Morrill—Act, as the legislation came to be known, provided the means to establish The Ohio State University, and defined its mission. The Morrill Act stated that the proceeds from the sale of state lands was to go into an endowment fund that would enable designated colleges and universities to offer tuition more cheaply because of the federal support. It also stipulated that the designated colleges and universities teach both scientific and classical studies, as well as military training. (The bill was signed in the midst of the Civil War, and few men recruited had any grasp of military strategy or tactics.) It also stipulated that these universities and colleges provide mechanical and agricultural instruction.

Morrill Tower is currently used for:
 Floor 2 is used as a dining hall and campus store
 Floor 3 is used as a lobby and the Student Life Office of Housing Administration
 Floors 4-23 are used for residence hall purposes

In 1978, serial killer and sex offender Jeffrey Dahmer enrolled at The Ohio State University and resided in Morrill Tower. Dahmer resided in Morrill Tower for only one quarter and never officially declared a major before flunking out of the Ohio State University.

In February 1998, a fire broke out on the 5th floor.  Students were evacuated; minimal damage occurred.
In August 1998, a fire broke out in suite 550 of the tower, resulting in room 553 being completely destroyed.

Lincoln Tower
Abraham Lincoln Tower was named for the nation's 16th president, Abraham Lincoln because he signed the Morrill Act into law in 1862, which established the system of land-grant institutions in the U.S. and thus made the founding of this University possible. Originally constructed as a dormitory, the lower 14 floors were converted in 1975 into office space, while the top nine floors remained student housing.

Lincoln Tower is currently used for:
Center for the Study of Student Life
Collegiate Recovery Community
Service2Facilities
Student Advocacy Center
Student Health Insurance
Student Life Budget and Planning
Student Life Facility Management and Logistics
Student Life Fiscal Support Services
Student Life Human Resources
Student Life Office of Student Conduct
The Ohio State University Wexner Medical Center Offices
Ohio State Esports Arena

Floors 1-14 of the tower are used for office spaces, while floors 15-23 are used for residence hall student rooms

Residence halls
The rooms in both Lincoln and Morrill are set up very different from other dormitories on campus. Each floor consists of 6 suites, 1 laundry room, 1 resident advisor room, and 3 supply closets. Within each of the suites is a common room, bathroom (that includes three-four sinks, two showers and three restroom stalls), 4 rooms (each of which includes a study connected to a bedroom). Each suite usually have 8-12 students in each; rooms are quads, triples or doubles (with the exception of the suite directly next to the RA room, which has a single room in it). A typical floor is home to 60-70 students.

The elevators in each of the residence halls are divided based on a low rise and high rise system. In Morrill, the low rise elevators go to floors 1, 3-14 and the high rise elevators goes to floors 1,3, 15-23. Only authorized officials can access floor 2 using the elevators. In Lincoln, low rise elevators reach floors 1-14 to access office space, while high rise elevators reach floors 1,2, and 15-23 to access student living. Each side of the building has 3 elevators.

The halls are co-ed by suite.

In popular media
Lincoln Tower appears in Apple, Inc.'s January 2014 ad campaign titled "Your Verse." It can be seen in the background as The Ohio State University Marching Band practices on the turf fields in the adjacent Lincoln Tower Park. The OSU Recreational and Physical Activity Center (RPAC) and McCorkle Aquatic Pavilion can also can be seen in the aerial video footage.

Gallery

References

External links
 The Ohio State University
 University Housing
 Morrill Tower
 Lincoln Tower

Ohio State University buildings
Twin towers
Residential buildings completed in 1967
1967 establishments in Ohio
Skyscraper office buildings in Columbus, Ohio
Residential skyscrapers in Columbus, Ohio
University District (Columbus, Ohio)